Tolaki (To'olaki) is the major language of Southeast Sulawesi, Indonesia. It is an Austronesian language of the Celebic branch.

Phonology 

References

Bungku–Tolaki languages
Languages of Sulawesi